Murchaur is a village in Sankhar village development committee Ward No-9, Syangja District, Gandaki Zone, Nepal. According to the 2011 Nepal census, held by Central Bureau of Statistics, it had a total population of 241.

References

External links 
MeroSyangja.Com
District Development Committee, Syangja

Populated places in Syangja District
Syangja District